Yadira Serrano Crespo (born 18 April 1976) is a Mexican politician affiliated with the Party of the Democratic Revolution. As of 2014 she served as Deputy of the LIX Legislature of the Mexican Congress as a plurinominal representative.

References

1976 births
Living people
Politicians from Guerrero
Women members of the Chamber of Deputies (Mexico)
Members of the Chamber of Deputies (Mexico)
Party of the Democratic Revolution politicians
Deputies of the LIX Legislature of Mexico